The Rebellion in Zacatecas of 1835 was part of the Mexican Federalist War  between Mexican centralists and federalists during the first half of the nineteenth century during the administration of Antonio Lopez de Santa Anna.

Background 
Following the failure of the federal system, centralism gained ground and Congress amended the Constitution of 1824 to create a centralist republic, limiting the power of states and reducing the military.

These events led to a rebellion in Zacatecas. The governor himself, Francisco García Salinas, led an army of about four thousand men against the government. To end the rebels, President Santa Anna in person went to fight, leaving the presidency in charge of General Miguel Barragán.

García Salinas was defeated in the Battle of Zacatecas (1835). Santa Anna allowed his troops to loot the city, then, and as punishment for the rebellion, the state of Zacatecas lost part of its territory, which formed the state of Aguascalientes.

This military action removed the final obstacles to centralism and led to the constitution of December 30, 1836, known as Siete Leyes, which limited the right to vote and removed the political and financial autonomy previously held by Mexican states.

References

Further reading 

Wars involving Mexico
1835 in Mexico
1835 in politics
April 1835 events
Conflicts in 1835